The 1993 Pepsi Champions Trophy was held in Sharjah, UAE, between October 28-November 5, 1993. Three national teams took part: Pakistan, Sri Lanka and West Indies.

The 1993 Champions Trophy started with a double round-robin tournament where each team played the other twice. The two leading teams qualified for the final. West Indies won the tournament and US$37,500, runners-up Pakistan won US$22,500 and Sri Lanka US$10,000.

The beneficiaries of the tournament were Mohammad Nazir (Pakistan), Shoaib Mohammad (Pakistan) and Desmond Haynes (West Indies) who each received US$35,000.

Matches

Group stage

Final

See also
 Sharjah Cup

References

 
 Cricket Archive: Pepsi Champions Trophy 1993/94
 ESPNCricinfo: Pepsi Champions Trophy, 1993/94
 

International cricket competitions from 1991–92 to 1994
Pepsi Champions Trophy, 1993
1993 in Emirati sport
International cricket competitions in the United Arab Emirates